Gymnastics  events have been contested at every Summer Olympic Games since the birth of the modern Olympic movement at the 1896 Summer Olympics in Athens. For 32 years, only men were allowed to compete.  Beginning at the 1928 Summer Olympics in Amsterdam, women were allowed to compete in artistic gymnastics events as well.  Rhythmic gymnastics events were introduced at the 1984 Summer Olympics in Los Angeles, and trampoline events were added at the 2000 Summer Olympics in Sydney.

Summary

Artistic gymnastics

Men's events

Women's events

Medal table

(1896–2020)

Nations

Nations competing in artistic gymnastics, and the number of gymnasts (male and female) each nation brought to each Olympics, are shown below.

Rhythmic gymnastics

Events

Medal table

(1984–2020)

Nations

Nations competing in rhythmic gymnastics and the number of gymnasts each nation brought to each Olympics, are shown below.

Trampoline

Events

Medal table

(2000–2020)

Nations

Nations competing in trampoline gymnastics and the number of gymnasts each nation brought to each Olympics, are shown below.

Overall medal table
Last updated after the 2020 Summer Olympic Games

See also

 Gymnastics at the Youth Olympic Games
 List of Olympic venues in gymnastics
 World Gymnastics Championships
 Gymnastics at the Alternate Olympics

Notes
A.As .

References

 Official Olympic Report
 www.gymnasticsresults.com
 www.gymn-forum.net

 
Sports at the Summer Olympics
Summer Olympics